Timeless, known as Time to Say Goodbye in the United States and Canada, is the fifth album by classical crossover soprano Sarah Brightman and the London Symphony Orchestra. The album went gold or platinum in 21 countries, selling over 1.4 million copies in the United States alone, and topped the Billboard Classical Crossover chart in the United States for 35 weeks. EMI's SACD 5.1 release of the album is also titled Time to Say Goodbye and follows the American track listing.

Commercial performance
This album peaked at No. 71 on the Billboard Top 200 albums, and peaked at number-one on the Billboard Top Classical Crossover Albums. On the Billboard Classical charts, it stayed at the peak for thirty-five consecutive weeks.

Track listing

Note
The Time to Say Goodbye release has the same tracks, but opens with the title song. Songs fall in the same order with that exception.

Singles
 "Time to Say Goodbye" (feat. Andrea Bocelli) (1996)
 "Just Show Me How to Love You" (1997)
 "Tú Quieres Volver" (1997)
 "There for Me" (1997)
 "Who Wants to Live Forever" (1997)

Charts

Weekly charts

Year-end charts

Certifications

References

1997 albums
Sarah Brightman albums
Albums produced by Frank Peterson
East West Records albums